Frédéric Marques (born 5 June 1985) is a French footballer who plays for FC Schifflange 95 as a striker.

Career
Marques was born in Thionville. He joined Créteil in 2010 after a successful 2009–10 campaign with Championnat de France amateur club CSO Amnéville in which he scored 27 goals in 31 appearances.

Marques began his career in Florange, a commune in the Moselle department, playing for local club RC Florange. He remained with the club following its merger with another local club ES Florange and made his debut with the club in 2004, while the club was playing in the Promotion d'Honneur of the Ligue de Lorraine, the eighth division of French football. Marques spent another season at the club before departing for Amnéville in 2006. Prior to joining Amnéville, Marques had an unsuccessful trial with professional club FC Metz. At Amnéville, Marques helped the team reach the Championnat de France amateur and, during the 2009–10 season, scored 27 goals in 31 appearances. Marques' play led to interest from FC Lorient, however, the club preferred he play on their reserve team and not the first team. He also drew interest from Laval, Troyes, and Strasbourg, among others. On 17 June 2010, Marques signed a contract with third division club Créteil.

References

External links
 FootNational Profile
 

1985 births
Living people
People from Thionville
Sportspeople from Moselle (department)
Association football forwards
French footballers
Championnat National players
Championnat National 2 players
CSO Amnéville players
US Créteil-Lusitanos players
SR Colmar players
RC Strasbourg Alsace players
Paris FC players
F91 Dudelange players
SAS Épinal players
French expatriate sportspeople in Luxembourg
FC Swift Hesperange players
Footballers from Grand Est
French expatriate footballers
Expatriate footballers in Luxembourg